Adam Hunter (11 November 1908 – 9 April 1991) was a British Labour Party politician.

Hunter was a miner and a Scottish executive member of the National Union of Mineworkers. He was elected a councillor on Fife County Council. He served as chairman of West Fife Constituency Labour Party and secretary of Fife Co-operative Association for many years.

Hunter was Member of Parliament for Dunfermline Burghs from 1964 to 1974, and then (after boundary changes) for Dunfermline until 1979, preceding Dick Douglas.

References
Times Guide to the House of Commons October 1974

External links 
 

1908 births
1991 deaths
Scottish Labour MPs
Members of the Parliament of the United Kingdom for Scottish constituencies
Members of the Parliament of the United Kingdom for Fife constituencies
National Union of Mineworkers-sponsored MPs
Councillors in Fife
UK MPs 1964–1966
UK MPs 1966–1970
UK MPs 1970–1974
UK MPs 1974
UK MPs 1974–1979
Scottish Labour councillors